Cerreto Castello was a comune (municipality) in the Province of Biella in the Italian region Piedmont, located about  northeast of Turin and about  east of Biella.

As a comune Cerreto Castello bordered the following municipalities: Cossato, Quaregna, Valdengo, Vigliano Biellese.

History 
From 1 January 2019 Cerrato Castello was absorbed by the new-born municipality of Quaregna Cerreto.

Demographic evolution

References

Cities and towns in Piedmont
Former municipalities of the Province of Biella